Brocchinia hechtioides is a species of plant in the genus Brocchinia. This species is native to Venezuela and Guyana. It is one of the two or three members of the genus (the others being B. reducta and possibly B. tatei) that appear to be carnivorous. The leaves form an urn which captures water and also serves as a pitfall trap for insects.

References

hechtioides
Flora of Venezuela
Flora of Guyana
Guayana Highlands
Plants described in 1913